The High Court of Kenya  is a court of unlimited original jurisdiction in criminal and civil matters established under article 165 of the constitution of Kenya. It also has supervisory jurisdiction over all other subordinate courts and any other persons, body or authority exercising a judicial or quasi-judicial function. It was known as the Supreme Court of Kenya until 1964 and its name has remain unchanged since then.

Jurisdiction 
The High Court has the following jurisdiction:

 unlimited original jurisdiction in criminal and civil matters;
 jurisdiction to determine the question whether a right or fundamental freedom in the Bill of Rights has been denied, violated, infringed or threatened;
 jurisdiction to hear an appeal from a decision of a tribunal appointed to consider the removal of a person from office, other than a tribunal appointed to consider the removal of Judges from office;
 jurisdiction to hear any question respecting the interpretation of the Constitution including the determination of the question whether any law is inconsistent with or in contravention of the Constitution, the question whether anything said to be done under the authority of the Constitution or of any law is inconsistent with, or in contravention of, the Constitution, any matter relating to constitutional powers of State organs in respect of county governments and any matter relating to the constitutional relationship between the levels of government, and a question relating to conflict of laws.

The High Court is also a court of admiralty, and exercises admiralty jurisdiction in all matters arising on the high seas, or in territorial waters, or upon any lake or other navigable inland waters in Kenya.

Organization 
There are forty one High Court stations spread throughout 39 Counties in Kenya, with ongoing work to ensure that each of the 47 Counties has at least one High Court station.

In stations like Nairobi, Mombasa and Kisumu where the High Court has a heavy caseload and multiple Judges, the Court is divided into Divisions. Each station or division is headed by a Presiding Judge. The Divisions are:
 Family & Children Division
 Commercial Division
 Admiralty Division
 Constitutional and Human Rights Division
 Judicial Review Division
 Criminal Division
 Civil Division
 Anti-Corruption & Economic Crimes Division

Composition
The High Court consists of a Principal Judge and not more than two hundred judges. There are presently 64 Judges of the High Court with ongoing recruitment of 20 additional judges.

A single Judge presides over the Court. However, parties to a case are at liberty to request that their cases be heard by an odd number of Judges being not less than three, where the case raises significant constitutional issues. In such cases, the Chief Justice picks the Judges who are to preside over these cases. Most of these cases are heard by 3 Judges. A few exceptional cases are heard by five Judges.

The court is headed by a Principal Judge who is elected by the Judges of the Court from among themselves. The current Principal Judge of the Court is Erick Kennedy Ogola who was elected on September 15, 2022 for a non-renewable five year term.

Current Justices 
The following are the current justices of the High Court:

 Erick Kennedy Ogola – Principal Judge
 Hatari Peter George Waweru
 Roseline P. V. Wendoh
 George Matatia Abaleka Dulu
 Mary Muhanji Kasango
 Joseph R. Karanja
 Florence N. Muchemi
 Maureen Akinyi Odero
 Said Juma Chitembwe
 Joseph Sergon
 Edward Muthoga Muriithi
 George Kanyi Kimondo
 David Amilcar S. Majanja – Representative in the Judicial Service Commission
 Cecilia Wathaiya Githua
 Christine W. Meoli
 Hedwig Imbosa Ong’udi
 Stella Ngali Mutuku
 James Wakiaga
 Rose Atieno Ougo
 George Vincent Odunga
 Hilary Kiplagat Chemitei
 Roseline C. Lagat Korir
 Richard Mururu Mwongo
 Alfred Mabeya
 Abigail Mshila
 Musyoka William Musya
 Jacqueline N. Kamau
 Ngaah Jairus
 Francis Muthuku Gikonyo
 Esther Nyambura Maina
 Lilian Nambwire Mutende
 Enock Mwita
 Charles Kariuki
 Antony Murima
 Robert Limo
 Roselyne Aburili
 Grace Nzioka
 Justus Bwonwonga
 Janet Mulwa
 Margaret Muigai
 Stephen Riechi
 Olga Sewe
 Wilfrida Okwany
 Patrick Otieno
 Anthony Ndung’u
 Mugure Thande
 Margaret Mwangi
 Stephen Githinji
 Dorah O. Chepkwony
 Asenath Ongeri
 Kiarie Waweru Kiarie
 Lucy Njuguna
 Reuben Nyakundi
 Onyiego John Nyabuto
 Cherere Thrispisa Wanjiku Wamae
 Ogola Daniel Ogembo
 Gitari Lucy Waruguru
 Ngetich Rachel C. Biomondo
 Kemei David Kipyegomen
 Onginjo Anne Colleta Apondi
 Matheka Teresia Mumbua
 Nyagah Jesse Njagi
 Martin Muya

Former Justices 
The following are some of the former justices of the High Court:
 John W. Mwera  –  Appointed Judge of Appeal on November 8, 2012
 George B. M. Kariuki – Appointed Judge of Appeal on November 8, 2012
 Mohammed K. Ibrahim – Appointed Judge of the Supreme Court on June 16, 2011
 Jackton Boma Ojwang – Appointed Judge of the Supreme Court on June 16, 2011
 Daniel K. Musinga  – Appointed Judge of Appeal on November 8, 2012
 Festus Azangalala – Appointed Judge of Appeal on November 8, 2012
 Milton S. A Makhandia – Appointed Judge of Appeal on November 8, 2012
 Abudullahi Warsame – Appointed Judge of Appeal on November 8, 2012
 William Ouko – Appointed Judge of Appeal on November 8, 2012
 Philomena Mbete Mwilu – Appointed Judge of Appeal on November 8, 2012
 Grace Ngenye Wangui – Appointed Judge of Appeal
 Lydia Awino Achode – Appointed Judge of Appeal
 Beatrice Thuranira Jaden – Deceased
 George Vincent Odunga – Appointed Judge of Appeal
 Weldon Korir Kipyegon – Appointed Judge of Appeal
 Pauline Nyamweya – Appointed Judge of Appeal
 Jessie W. Lesiit – Appointed Judge of Appeal
 John Mativo – Appointed Judge of Appeal
 Amraphael Mbogholi Msagha – Appointed Judge of Appeal
 Frederick A. Ochieng’ – Appointed Judge of Appeal
 Luka K. Kimaru – Appointed Judge of Appeal
 A. O. Muchelule – Appointed Judge of Appeal
 Joel Ngugi Mwaura – Appointed Judge of Appeal
 Ngugi Grace Mumbi – Appointed Judge of Appeal

References

Government of Kenya
Judiciary of Kenya
Courts and tribunals with year of establishment missing